The Forest (Guernésiais: La Fouarêt, French: La Forêt) is a parish in Guernsey. It is the highest parish on the island, with altitudes of up to about 100 m. The full title of the parish is Ste Marguerite de la Foret, after the parish church.

The old Guernésiais nickname for people from La Fouarêt was bourdaons.

The postal codes for street addresses in this parish begin with GY8.

Forest was the first parish in the Island to receive some unwelcome visitors. Chief Officer Inspector W Sculpher recorded the following in the Occurrence Book dated Wednesday, 3 July 1940: "I beg to report that at about 8pm on 30th June a number of German Armed Forces landed at the Airport, Forest."

Geography
The Forest is located in the south of Guernsey. It borders the parishes of St Peter's to the west, St Saviour's to the north-west, St Andrew's to the north and St Martin's to the east.

Beaches
The south coast is mostly made up of cliffs, but the beaches in The Forest include:
 Le Portelet (inaccessible from land; it can be accessed by swimming from Petit Bôt or by boat)
 Part of Petit Bôt

Relief
The parish goes up to an altitude of about 100 m (the highest in the island). The only low areas are at the coast, where there are steep cliffs.

Climate

The Meteorological Observatory has been at Guernsey Airport since it was built in 1939.

Features

The features of the parish include:
 Forest church
 Forest Methodist church
 Coast
 A cliff walk along the South coast 
 Petit Bôt bay 
 Le Portelet
 Guernsey Airport
 Guernsey's highest point
 Le Perron du Roi megalith 
 Military:
 Parish war memorial inside church Lych gate
 Tower 13, Petit Bôt Bay
 St Clair Battery dating from the Napoleonic Wars
 Saints Bay Battery dating from the Napoleonic Wars
 German Occupation Museum 
 German fortifications, built during the occupation 1940–45
 Abreuvoirs (places for cattle to drink) 
 A number of protected buildings 

The parish of the Forest hosts:
 Forest Douzaine Room
 Aurigny has its head office on the airport property
 The Mallard Cinema 
 Countryside walks 
 The Met Office

Main roads

The following main roads (listed from west–east) provide important links between The Forest and the other parishes:
 Rue De Manoir (leads to Torteval)
 Rue De Farras (leads to St Peter's)
 Route Des Blicqs (leads to St Andrew's, St Peter Port and the North of the island)
 Forest Road (leads to St Martin's)
The following main roads (listed from west–east) are also very important as they provide access to the Parish Centre and the Airport:
 Rue Des Landes
 Le Bourg

Politics
Forest comprises part of the West administrative division with Torteval, St. Saviour's and St. Pierre-du-Bois

In the 2016 Guernsey general election there was a 3,188 or 74% turnout to elect five Deputies. Those elected (in order of votes received) being Al Brouard, Andrea Dudley-Owen, Emilie Yerby, David De Lisle and Shane Langlois.

Notable people

Ernest Martin Jehan, Royal Navy officer during World War I
Thomas de la Rue, founder of De La Rue plc
 William Le Lacheur, sea captain with strong links to Costa Rica

References

External links
 Forest Parish website
 Parish information

Forest